Emory is a city in Rains County, Texas, United States. The population was 1,239 at the 2010 census. It is the county seat of Rains County. Previously known as Springville, the city and county are named after Emory Rains who was a legislator from the area. Rains was the author of the Homestead Law of Texas which was later used as a model for the protection of homesteads throughout the United States. Special legislation passed to create Rains County called for the citizens to vote on the location of the county seat and for that selected town to be named Emory.

Geography 

Emory is located at  (32.876773, –95.766404).

According to the United States CensusBureau, the city has a total area of 1.98 sq miles of which 1.96 sq miles is land and 0.02 sq miles is water.

Emory is located between two of Texas' most popular lakes:  Lake Tawakoni to its west and Lake Fork Reservoir to its east.

The climate in this area is characterized by hot, humid summers and generally mild to cool winters.  According to the Köppen Climate Classification system, Emory has a humid subtropical climate, abbreviated "Cfa" on climate maps.

Demographics 

As of the census of 2019, there were 1,426 people living in the city. As of the 2020 United States census, there were 1,251 people, 468 households, and 305 families residing in the city.

In 2019, there were 484 households, out of which 26.0% had children under the age of 18 living with them, 38.8% were married couples living together, 20.5% had a female householder with no husband present, and 34.7% were non-families. 29.3% of all households were made up of individuals, and 14.5% had someone living alone who was 65 years of age or older. The average household size was 2.32 and the average family size was 2.94.

In the city, the age distribution of the population shows 22.7% under the age of 18, 9.2% from 18 to 24, 24.8% from 25 to 44, 23.8% from 45 to 64, and 19.6% who were 65 years of age or older. The median age was 38.9 years. For every 100 females, there were 92.7 males.

As of 2019 estimates, the median income for a household in the city was $55,912, and the median income for a family was $67,834. Males had a median income of $34,076 versus $24,722 for females. The per capita income for the city was $15,107. About 16.15% of the population were below the poverty line, including 10.2% of those under age 18 and 21.7% of those age 65 or over.

Education 
The City of Emory is served by the Rains Independent School District.  On May 30, 2019, the Rains LadyCats softball team won their first state title by defeating the Hallettsville High School Lady Brahmas by a score of 6-2 in Austin, TX at McCombs Field on the campus of University of Texas at Austin.

References

External links 
 City website

Cities in Texas
Cities in Rains County, Texas
County seats in Texas